Interlaken is a borough in Monmouth County, in the U.S. state of New Jersey. As of the 2020 United States census, the borough's population was 828, an increase of 8 (+1.0%) from the 2010 census count of 820, which in turn reflected a decline of 80 (−8.9%) from the 900 counted in the 2000 census.

Interlaken was authorized for prospective incorporation as a borough by an act of the New Jersey Legislature on March 11, 1922, from portions of Ocean Township, subject to approval by a majority of voters in the affected area.  Voters approved the incorporation of Interlaken in a referendum held on May 3, 1922.

Interlaken is a dry town where alcohol is not permitted to be sold by law.

History
The area that is now Interlaken was purchased in 1667 by Gavin Drummond from the Lenape Native Americans. It was later part of Ocean Township, which had seceded from Shrewsbury Township in 1849 and included at the time present-day Eatontown, Neptune Township, Neptune City, Avon-by-the-Sea, Bradley Beach, Asbury Park, Allenhurst, Deal, Long Branch, West Long Branch, Loch Arbour, Monmouth Beach, Sea Bright and Oceanport, along with Interlaken itself.

Dr. Francis Weld, a Boston physician, bought a  tract and named it Interlaken Farm, after Interlaken, a peninsula in Switzerland situated between two lakes, that they had just visited, which was similar to the borough's location between two sections of Deal Lake. Weld established the Interlaken Land Company in 1890 to turn his farm into a residential community with avenues named after English lakes and cross streets named after the islands in the Hebrides in the Irish Sea. While the initial effort did not succeed, the Stormfelz-Lovely-Neville Company was hired in 1905 to continue the building project, and the community began its growth.

Interlaken was formed as a borough on March 11, 1922, based on the results of a referendum held on May 3, 1922. The first Mayor and Council of Interlaken were seated on June 26, 1922.

Interlaken remains entirely residential, as was originally intended by its developers. The borough had been the only municipality in the state without any businesses, until a day-care center opened in 1992 under the terms of a state law that required approval of child care establishments serving five children or fewer.

Geography
According to the United States Census Bureau, the borough had a total area of 0.39 square miles (1.01 km2), including 0.33 square miles (0.86 km2) of land and 0.06 square miles (0.15 km2) of water (14.62%).

The borough borders the Monmouth County community of Allenhurst, Asbury Park, Loch Arbour and Ocean Township.

Demographics

2010 census

The Census Bureau's 2006–2010 American Community Survey showed that (in 2010 inflation-adjusted dollars) median household income was $116,000 (with a margin of error of +/− $16,207) and the median family income was $137,500 (+/− $17,077). Males had a median income of $116,250 (+/− $10,733) versus $60,833 (+/− $21,986) for females. The per capita income for the borough was $72,484 (+/− $11,388). About 2.7% of families and 2.1% of the population were below the poverty line, including none of those under age 18 and 4.2% of those age 65 or over.

2000 census
As of the 2000 United States census there were 900 people, 386 households, and 260 families residing in the borough. The population density was 2,556.2 people per square mile (992.8/km2). There were 397 housing units at an average density of 1,127.6 per square mile (438.0/km2). The racial makeup of the borough was 98.67% White, 0.22% Asian, 0.11% Pacific Islander, and 1.00% from two or more races. Hispanic or Latino of any race were 1.11% of the population.

There were 386 households, out of which 21.0% had children under the age of 18 living with them, 59.1% were married couples living together, 6.7% had a female householder with no husband present, and 32.4% were non-families. 27.5% of all households were made up of individuals, and 15.8% had someone living alone who was 65 years of age or older. The average household size was 2.33 and the average family size was 2.86.

In the borough the population was spread out, with 17.9% under the age of 18, 4.0% from 18 to 24, 21.9% from 25 to 44, 33.4% from 45 to 64, and 22.8% who were 65 years of age or older. The median age was 48 years. For every 100 females, there were 93.5 males. For every 100 females age 18 and over, there were 89.0 males.

The median income for a household in the borough was $82,842, and the median income for a family was $104,618. Males had a median income of $81,203 versus $59,063 for females. The per capita income for the borough was $47,307. About 1.5% of families and 3.0% of the population were below the poverty line, including 3.7% of those under age 18 and 2.0% of those age 65 or over.

Government

Local government
Interlaken is governed under the Borough form of New Jersey municipal government, which is used in 218 municipalities (of the 564) statewide, making it the most common form of government in New Jersey. The governing body is comprised of the Mayor and the Borough Council, with all positions elected at-large on a partisan basis as part of the November general election. A Mayor is elected directly by the voters to a four-year term of office. The Borough Council is comprised of six members elected to serve three-year terms on a staggered basis, with two seats coming up for election each year in a three-year cycle. The Borough form of government used by Interlaken is a "weak mayor / strong council" government in which council members act as the legislative body with the mayor presiding at meetings and voting only in the event of a tie. The mayor can veto ordinances subject to an override by a two-thirds majority vote of the council. The mayor makes committee and liaison assignments for council members, and most appointments are made by the mayor with the advice and consent of the council.

, the Mayor of Interlaken is Republican Michael Nohilly, whose term of office ends on December 31, 2023. Members of the Borough Council are Council President John Rush Butler (R, 2022), Michael Delia (R, 2024), Michael DeSarno (R, 2024), Mervin Franks (R, 2023) and Mindy Horowitz (R, 2023), with one seat vacant.

In July 2018, the Borough Council selected Rick Menditto to fill the seat expiring in December 2020 that had been held by Republican John Gunn until he resignedfrom office the previous month. In the November 2018 general election, Democrat Arthur Fama defeated Menditto and was elected to serve the balance of the term of office.

In September 2016, the Borough Council selected John Rush Butler to fill the vacant seat expiring in December 2016 that had been held by Keith Miller until his resignation earlier that month; Butler will serve on an interim basis until the November 2016 general election, when voters will choose a candidate to serve the balance of the term of office.

Federal, state and county representation
Interlaken is located in the 6th Congressional District and is part of New Jersey's 11th state legislative district.

 

Monmouth County is governed by a Board of County Commissioners comprised of five members who are elected at-large to serve three year terms of office on a staggered basis, with either one or two seats up for election each year as part of the November general election. At an annual reorganization meeting held in the beginning of January, the board selects one of its members to serve as director and another as deputy director. , Monmouth County's Commissioners are
Commissioner Director Thomas A. Arnone (R, Neptune City, term as commissioner and as director ends December 31, 2022), 
Commissioner Deputy Director Susan M. Kiley (R, Hazlet Township, term as commissioner ends December 31, 2024; term as deputy commissioner director ends 2022),
Lillian G. Burry (R, Colts Neck Township, 2023),
Nick DiRocco (R, Wall Township, 2022), and 
Ross F. Licitra (R, Marlboro Township, 2023). 
Constitutional officers elected on a countywide basis are
County clerk Christine Giordano Hanlon (R, 2025; Ocean Township), 
Sheriff Shaun Golden (R, 2022; Howell Township) and 
Surrogate Rosemarie D. Peters (R, 2026; Middletown Township).

Politics
As of March 2011, there were a total of 749 registered voters in Interlaken, of which 183 (24.4%) were registered as Democrats, 371 (49.5%) were registered as Republicans and 195 (26.0%) were registered as Unaffiliated. There were no voters registered to other parties.

In the 2012 presidential election, Republican Mitt Romney received 61.5% of the vote (362 cast), ahead of Democrat Barack Obama with 38.0% (224 votes), and other candidates with 0.5% (3 votes), among the 595 ballots cast by the borough's 781 registered voters (6 ballots were spoiled), for a turnout of 76.2%. In the 2008 presidential election, Republican John McCain received 59.6% of the vote (379 cast), ahead of Democrat Barack Obama with 36.9% (235 votes) and other candidates with 1.9% (12 votes), among the 636 ballots cast by the borough's 766 registered voters, for a turnout of 83.0%. In the 2004 presidential election, Republican George W. Bush received 59.0% of the vote (372 ballots cast), outpolling Democrat John Kerry with 38.8% (245 votes) and other candidates with 1.0% (8 votes), among the 631 ballots cast by the borough's 776 registered voters, for a turnout percentage of 81.3.

In the 2013 gubernatorial election, Republican Chris Christie received 75.4% of the vote (383 cast), ahead of Democrat Barbara Buono with 23.4% (119 votes), and other candidates with 1.2% (6 votes), among the 523 ballots cast by the borough's 774 registered voters (15 ballots were spoiled), for a turnout of 67.6%. In the 2009 gubernatorial election, Republican Chris Christie received 63.5% of the vote (360 ballots cast), ahead of Democrat Jon Corzine with 26.5% (150 votes), Independent Chris Daggett with 7.9% (45 votes) and other candidates with 0.5% (3 votes), among the 567 ballots cast by the borough's 760 registered voters, yielding a 74.6% turnout.

Education
Interlaken is a non-operating school district. Students from Interlaken attend the schools of the West Long Branch Public Schools for pre-kindergarten through eighth grade as part of a sending/receiving relationship in which students attend on a tuition basis along with students from Allenhurst, New Jersey and Loch Arbour, New Jersey, each with its own sending/receiving relationship. As of the 2018–19 school year, the district, comprising two schools, had an enrollment of 573 students and 62.4 classroom teachers (on an FTE basis), for a student–teacher ratio of 9.2:1. Schools in the district (with 2018–19 enrollment data from the National Center for Education Statistics) are 
Betty McElmon Elementary School with 310 students in pre-Kindergarten through fourth grade and 
Frank Antonides School with 256 students in fifth through eighth grades.

For ninth through twelfth grades, public school students attend Shore Regional High School, a regional high school located in West Long Branch that also serves students from the constituent districts of Monmouth Beach, Oceanport, Sea Bright and West Long Branch. The high school is part of the Shore Regional High School District. As of the 2017–2018 school year, the high school had an enrollment of 651 students and 56.0 classroom teachers (on an FTE basis), for a student–teacher ratio of 11.6:1.

Transportation

No major highways pass directly serve Interlaken, with only minor roads such as County Route 15 passing directly through the borough. Route 18, Route 35, Route 66 and Route 71 are accessible in its neighboring communities. The Garden State Parkway is also not too far away.

Notable people

People who were born in, residents of, or otherwise closely associated with Interlaken:

 Danny DeVito (born 1944), television and film actor who had a vacation home in Interlaken
 Fred J. Cook (1911–2003), investigative journalist, author and historian
 Jack Ford, television news personality specializing in legal commentary
 Rhea Perlman (born 1948), long time wife of Danny DeVito, now separated

References

External links

 Borough of Interlaken official website
 West Long Branch Public Schools
 
 West Long Branch Public Schools, National Center for Education Statistics
 Shore Regional High School

 
1922 establishments in New Jersey
Borough form of New Jersey government
Boroughs in Monmouth County, New Jersey
New Jersey District Factor Group none
Populated places established in 1922